Dýrð í dauðaþögn is the debut album by the Icelandic singer-songwriter Ásgeir Trausti. The album was recorded in three or four months in the summer of 2012. Most of the original Icelandic lyrics were written by Ásgeir's father.

The album reached number thirty-four in Denmark,  and number one in Iceland where it has since been awarded triple platinum certification. It became the best selling debut album ever in Iceland.  It is also reported to be owned by one in every ten people in Iceland.

As well as being nominated for the Best Album of the Year award at the 2012 Nordic Music Prize, the album won the Album of the Year at the 2012 Icelandic Music Awards and it received a Kraumur Award.

In the Silence, an English language version of the album, translated by the American musician John Grant, was released online on 28 October 2013, and physically on January 27, 2014. Only the vocal part is different from Dýrð í dauðaþögn.

Track listing

Personnel
Musicians
 Ásgeir Trausti Einarsson – vocals (all tracks), backing vocals (all tracks), guitar (all tracks), bass guitar (tracks 6, 9, 10), keyboards (tracks 1–9), piano (tracks 1, 3, 4, 5, 6, 7, 9, 10)
 Sigurður Guðmundsson – keyboards (tracks 1, 2, 3, 4, 6, 7, 8, 9), piano (track 2), bass guitar (tracks 2, 3, 4), backing vocals (track 3), harmonium (track 5)
 Kristinn Snær Agnarsson – drums (tracks 1, 2, 4, 6, 7, 9), percussion (track 3)
 Þorsteinn Einarsson – guitar (tracks 2, 3), backing vocals (tracks 3, 10)
 Samúel Jón Samúelsson – trombone (tracks 1, 2, 4, 7, 9)
 Kjartan Hákonarson – trumpet (tracks 1, 2, 4, 7, 9)
 Óskar Guðjónsson – saxophone (tracks 1, 2, 4, 7, 9)
 Valdimar Kolbeinn Sigurjónsson – bass guitar (track 1)
 Ingi Björn Ingasson – bass guitar (track 4)

Recording personnel
 Guðmundur Kristinn Jónsson – producer, recording, mixing
 Sigurður Guðmundsson – recording
 Kristinn Snær Agnarsson – recording
 Ásgeir Trausti Einarsson – recording

Other personnel
 Svarti Hrinhurinn – cover art
 Jónína de la Rosa – photography
 Bobby Breiðholt – design

Charts

References

2012 debut albums
Icelandic-language albums
Ásgeir Trausti albums
European Border Breakers Award-winning albums